Group D of the 2019 CONCACAF Gold Cup took place from 18 to 26 June 2019. The group consisted of Guyana, Panama, Trinidad and Tobago, and was co-hosted by the United States, the defending champions of the competition. The top two teams, the United States and Panama, advanced to the knockout stage.

Teams

Notes

Standings

In the quarter-finals:
The winners of Group D, the United States, advanced to play the runners-up of Group C, Curaçao.
The runners-up of Group D, Panama, advanced to play the winners of Group C, Jamaica.

Matches

Panama vs Trinidad and Tobago

United States vs Guyana

Guyana vs Panama

United States vs Trinidad and Tobago

Trinidad and Tobago vs Guyana

Panama vs United States

Discipline
Fair play points would have been used as tiebreakers if the overall and head-to-head records of teams were tied. These were calculated based on yellow and red cards received in all group matches as follows:
first yellow card: minus 1 point;
indirect red card (second yellow card): minus 3 points;
direct red card: minus 4 points;
yellow card and direct red card: minus 5 points;

Only one of the above deductions were applied to a player in a single match.

References

External links
 

Group D